The Gauliga Schlesien was the highest football league in the region of Silesia (German:Schlesien), which consisted of the Prussian provinces of Lower Silesia and Upper Silesia from 1933 to 1945. Shortly after the formation of the league, the Nazis reorganised the administrative regions in Germany, and the Gau Silesia, later subdivided into Gau Upper Silesia and Gau Lower Silesia, replaced the Prussian provinces.

After the Polish defeat in 1939, the parts of Upper Silesia awarded to Poland after the First World War were reoccupied by Nazi Germany and added to the Gau Oberschlesien.

From 1941, the Gauliga Schlesien was split into two separate leagues, the Gauliga Niederschlesien and the Gauliga Oberschlesien.

Overview

Gauliga Schlesien
The league was introduced by the Nazi Sports Office in 1933, after the Nazi takeover of power in Germany. It replaced the Oberliga as the highest level of play of the regional football competitions.

In its first season, the league had ten clubs, playing each other once at home and once away. The league champion then qualified for the German championship. The bottom two teams were relegated. The league modus and strength did not change until 1939.

Because of the outbreak of World War II  in 1939, the league was split into two regional groups, one of five and one of seven clubs and the season start was delayed until early December 1939. The two group champions then played a home-and-away final for the Gauliga championship. For its last season, 1940–41, it returned to a single-division format, now with eleven clubs, some of them from the newly occupied regions formerly part of Poland. This last season was however not completed and with most teams having only one or two games to go, a winner was declared and the competition cancelled.

After this, the league was split into two separate competitions.

Gauliga Niederschlesien
The league started with nine clubs in one single division, all from the region of the former Prussian province. It was increased to ten clubs for its second season, 1942–43.

The last completed season, 1943–44, the league was subdivided in three regions with all-up five divisions. the three regional champions then played out the Gauliga champion. All together, a record 33 clubs took part in this season.

The arrival of the war in the region made football impossible and, most likely, the last season, 1944–45,  did not get underway at all anymore.

Gauliga Oberschlesien
The new Gauliga Oberschlesien compromised the pre-war area of Upper Silesia and the formerly Polish reoccupied parts of the region.

The league started out with ten clubs in one single division in 1941. It was reduced to nine clubs for its second season 1942-43 but returned to ten clubs in the next year.

In its last season, 1944–45, it was meant to have nine clubs again but the arrival of the war in Silesia meant an early cancellation of the competition.

Aftermath
With the end of the Nazi era, the Gauligas ceased to exist and Silesia became part of the Soviet occupation zone. In turn, the Soviets handed over the region to Poland as compensation for the territories they lost in their east. Only a very small part of Silesia, the area west of the river Neiße, remained with Germany, becoming part of the new East Germany.

The majority of Germans in the region were forced to leave Silesia and almost all German football clubs disbanded. The region became part of the Polish football league system.

The small remaining part of Silesia not awarded to Poland, mainly the former Niederschlesischer Oberlausitzkreis, is now part of the German federal state of Saxony.

Founding members of the league
The ten founding members and their league positions in 1932-33 were:
 Beuthener SuSV 09, champions Oberschlesien division, champion of South-East Germany
 SpVgg 02 Breslau
 SC Hertha Breslau
 Vorwärts-Rasensport Gleiwitz
 SC Vorwärts Breslau
 SpVgg Ratibor 03
 SC Preußen Hindenburg
 FV 06 Breslau
 SV 1919 Hoyerswerda
 STC Görlitz, champions Oberlausitz division

Winners and runners-up of the league
The winners and runners-up of the league:

Gauliga Schlesien

 *  winner declared.

Gauliga Niederschlesien

Gauliga Oberschlesien

Placings in the league 1933-44
The complete list of all clubs participating in the league:

Gauliga Schlesien

 The 1940–41 season was not completed, Germania Königshütte led the league after having played 19 of 20 games but Vorwärts Rasensport Gleiwitz was declared league champions, sitting in second place, two points behind with three games left to play.

Gauliga Niederschlesien

Gauliga Oberschlesien

Clubs from Poland in the Gauliga Schlesien
From 1940, clubs from the occupied country of Poland took part in the German Gauliga system. These clubs, from the region of Upper Slesia, could only take part in the German league system after germanising its name and declaring themselves German.

The following clubs played in the Gauliga under their Germanised names:
 TuS Schwientochlowitz, was Śląsk Świętochłowice
 TuS Lipine, was Naprzód Lipiny
 Germania Königshütte, was AKS Chorzów
 1. FC Kattowitz, retained its name
 Bismarckhütter SV 99, was Ruch Chorzów
 RSG Myslowitz, from Mysłowice
 Sportfreunde Knurow, from Knurów
 Adler Tarnowitz, from Tarnowskie Góry
 Reichsbahn SG Kattowitz, from Katowice

References

Sources
 Die deutschen Gauligen 1933-45 - Heft 1-3  Tables of the Gauligas 1933–45, publisher: DSFS
 Kicker Almanach,  The yearbook on German football from Bundesliga to Oberliga, since 1937, published by the Kicker Sports Magazine

External links
  The Gauligas Das Deutsche Fussball Archiv 
 Germany - Championships 1902-1945 at RSSSF.com
 Where's My Country? Article on cross-border movements of football clubs, at RSSSF.com

Gauliga
Football competitions in Saxony
Football competitions in Silesia
Sports leagues established in 1933
1933 establishments in Germany
1945 disestablishments in Germany